Billy McLean may refer to:
Billy McLean (umpire) (1835–1927), English-born American baseball umpire
Billy McLean (politician) (1918–1986), British Army officer and politician